The International High School at LaGuardia Community College is a high school in Queens, New York City.

History
Former Principal Eric Nadelstern founded the International High School at LaGuardia Community College in 1985 as a joint venture by the New York City Board of Education and the Board of Higher Education of the City of New York. The school has been designated as an Academic Excellence Project and has twice been cited as a Center of Excellence for the teaching of English communication arts.  Nadelstern left the school to join the NY Department of Education.  After holding a variety of roles, Nadelstern is the department's chief schools officer and reports directly to the Chancellor.  The school's success has been the model of 11 additional International high schools in New York and California.  All twelve high schools belong to the Internationals Network for Public Schools, an educational non-profit that supports these schools and an expansion of the model to serve English language learners throughout the United States.

Curriculum
IHS curriculum requirements meet or exceed all New York State Education Department standards for a high school diploma. All classes are heterogeneous (mixed) by language, achievement, grade level, and age. Classes are structured around the development of thematic projects in cooperative learning groups. Students work in depth, both collaboratively and independently.

Students fulfill graduation requirements by passing year-long interdisciplinary programs incorporating the Humanities, Math/Science/Technology, and Applied Learning. There are six interdisciplinary programs based on such themes as:
American Dream: Bridges to Reality
Connections
Inquiry and Action
Origins, Growth, and Structures
Projects and Adventures in New York City
The World Around Us/World of Money

Applied Learning Opportunities
Interdisciplinary programs give students a variety of opportunities to apply what they learn in the classroom to real life situations, such as working with architects to build bridges or environmentalists to clean up polluted bodies of ware. Two special programs include internship and community service.

Internship: Some teams offer career education internships where students explore careers they are interested in while attending high school. During an internship, students take two classes and for the rest work for various organizations and companies. Internship sites include government agencies, big and small businesses, and hospitals.

Community Service: Another team offers students an opportunity to develop a community service project in class and put it into practice. In the past students have researched and presented material on teen issues and developed a website.

Graduation Certification
Students graduate when they have successfully completed a minimum of four years of interdisciplinary study and have been certified by a panel including faculty, students, and representatives from the educational community.
Each student is sponsored by a faculty mentor who assists the student in assembling a portfolio of performance-based assessment tasks drawn from their course work and prepares a presentation. The student may include college course work, and other evidence of growth and mastery as part of their petition for graduation. This panel will determine if the student's progress meets or exceeds the student performance standards for graduation in New York State, and merits graduation from The International High School.
Certification for graduation is based on a consensus of the panel and is also subject to successful completion of course work. Graduation panels are scheduled during January, June, and August.

Graduation Portfolio
Over 90% of IHS students graduate and go on to two or four year colleges. In addition to CUNY, many of our graduates continue to study and complete their college degrees with partial or full financial aid, including scholarships at many of the top universities in the country.

References 

The Internationals Network for Public Schools

External links 

 Official Website
 Internationals Network For Public Schools 

Public high schools in Queens, New York
International high schools
International schools in New York City
LaGuardia Community College
1985 establishments in New York City